This is a list of individuals who served in the House of representatives of Nigeria in the 7th National Assembly.

References 

House of Representatives